The Florida Museum of Natural History (FLMNH) is Florida's official state-sponsored and chartered natural-history museum.  Its main facilities are located at 3215 Hull Road on the campus of the University of Florida in Gainesville.

The main public exhibit facility, Powell Hall and the attached McGuire Center, is located in the Cultural Plaza, which it shares with the Samuel P. Harn Museum of Art and the Curtis M. Phillips Center for the Performing Arts. The main research facility and former public exhibits building, Dickinson Hall, is located on the east side of campus at the corner of Museum Road and Newell Drive. On April 18, 2012, the American Institute of Architects's Florida chapter placed Dickinson Hall on its list of Florida Architecture: 100 Years. 100 Places as the Florida Museum of Natural History / Formerly Florida Museum of Natural Sciences.

Powell Hall's permanent public exhibits focus on the flora, fauna, fossils, and historic peoples of the state of Florida. The museum does not charge for admission to most exhibits; the exceptions are the Butterfly Rainforest and certain traveling exhibits.

The museum's collections were first used for teaching at Florida Agriculture College in Lake City in the 1800s, and were relocated to the campus of the University of Florida in 1906. The museum was chartered as the state's official natural history museum by the Florida Legislature in 1917. Formerly known as the Florida State Museum, the name was changed in 1988 to more accurately reflect the museum's mission and help avoid confusion with Florida State University, which is located in Tallahassee.

The Florida Museum of Natural History partnered with the Alachua County Library to help provide Zoom events, virtual tours, and online exhibits so that visitors can stay involved despite the changes the library has endured due to the COVID-19 pandemic.

History

Enabling legislation 

The role of the Florida Museum of Natural History as the official natural history museum for Florida is defined by Florida Statute §1004.56, which states:

"The functions of the Florida Museum of Natural History, located at the University of Florida, are to make scientific investigations toward the sustained development of natural resources and a greater appreciation of human cultural heritage, including, but not limited to, biological surveys, ecological studies, environmental impact assessments, in-depth archaeological research, and ethnological analyzes, and to collect and maintain a depository of biological, archaeological, and ethnographic specimens and materials in sufficient numbers and quantities to provide within the state and region a base for research on the variety, evolution, and conservation of wild species; the composition, distribution, importance, and functioning of natural ecosystems; and the distribution of prehistoric and historic archaeological sites and an understanding of the aboriginal and early European cultures that occupied them.

State institutions, departments, and agencies may deposit type collections from archaeological sites in the museum, and it shall be the duty of each state institution, department, and agency to cooperate by depositing in the museum voucher and type biological specimens collected as part of the normal research and monitoring duties of its staff and to transfer to the museum those biological specimens and collections in its possession but not actively being curated or used in the research or teaching of that institution, department, or agency.

The Florida Museum of Natural History is empowered to accept, preserve, maintain, or dispose of these specimens and materials in a manner which makes each collection and its accompanying data available for research and use to the staff of the museum and by cooperating institutions, departments, agencies, and qualified independent researchers.

The biological, archaeological, and ethnographic collections shall belong to the state with the title vested in the Florida Museum of Natural History...In collecting or otherwise acquiring these collections, the Florida Museum of Natural History, except as provided in s. 267.12(3) shall comply with pertinent state wildlife, archaeological, and agricultural laws and rules.

However, all collecting, quarantine, and accreditation permits issued by other institutions, departments, and agencies shall be granted routinely for said museum research study or collecting effort on state lands or within state jurisdiction which does not pose a significant threat to the survival of endangered wild species, habitats, or ecosystems.

In addition, the museum shall develop exhibitions and conduct programs which illustrate, interpret, and explain the natural history of the state and region and shall maintain a library of publications pertaining to the work as herein provided.

The exhibitions, collections, and library of the museum shall be open, free to the public, under suitable rules to be promulgated by the director of the museum and approved by the University of Florida."

Current facilities 
In the over 100 years of operation, the Florida Museum of Natural History has been housed in several buildings, from the Seagle Building in downtown Gainesville, to the three halls on campus and one off-site research facility.

Dickinson Hall 

Dickinson Hall, opened in 1971, is located on Museum Road.  It currently houses over 25 million objects and artifacts in its collections, which include ichthyology, paleontology (both vertebrate and invertebrate), botany, paleobotany and palynology, herpetology, malacology, mammalogy, ornithology, environmental archaeology, historical archaeology, archeology of the Caribbean and Florida, and the ethnography of Latin and North Americas. It also houses a state-of-the-art Molecular Systematics and Evolutionary Genetics lab.

Powell Hall 
Located in the University of Florida Cultural Plaza, Powell Hall was constructed in 1995 on Hull Road near S.W. 34th Street, about 2 miles west of Dickinson Hall. It serves, along with the connected McGuire Center, as the main exhibits and public programs facility. Powell Hall was partially funded from a gift of $3 million from two University of Florida alumni couples; Bob and Ann and Steve and Carol Powell of Fort Lauderdale, and with matching funds from the National Endowment for the Humanities and from the Florida state government.

Randell Research Center 

This research and education program is an extension of the museum's Southwest Florida Project and "Year of the Indian" archeology/education project.

In 2008, the Randell Research Center completed a two-year program to plant more than 800 native trees to replace ones destroyed in the 2004 hurricanes Charley and Frances.

McGuire Center for Lepidoptera and Biodiversity 

In 2000, William W. McGuire, then CEO of UnitedHealth Group, gave a $4.2 million gift to establish the William W. and Nadine M. McGuire Center for Lepidoptera and Biodiversity. This gift was one of the largest private gifts ever given to foster research on insects, and was matched from the State of Florida Alec Courtelis Facilities Enhancement Challenge Grant Program. The McGuires later gave another $3 million to fund final construction of the center. This new $12 million facility for Lepidoptera research and public exhibits opened in August 2004.

The center houses a collection of more than 10 million butterfly and moth specimens, making it one of the largest collections of Lepidoptera in the world, rivaling that of the Natural History Museum in London. The collection includes extinct species. It started with around four million specimens, with space for significant further expansion. The collection brings together those from the Allyn Museum in Sarasota, other University of Florida collections, and the State of Florida's Division of Plant Industry collections.

The McGuire Center for Lepidoptera and Biodiversity serves both research and public education functions.

The research space includes laboratories focusing on molecular genetics, scanning electron microscopy, image analysis, conservation and captive propagation of endangered species, optical microscopy, and specimen preparation, as well as classrooms and offices for 12 faculty curators, collection managers, and other staff. Some of the research laboratories and collections can be viewed through glass panels at the back of the museum.

Public exhibits

Butterfly Rainforest 

The Butterfly Rainforest is a display of live butterflies in a large, outdoor enclosed space attached to the museum. It is the main exhibit in the McGuire Center which is accessed from the main entrance of Powell Hall. At any given time, the exhibit contains over 50 species of butterfly and moth species, totaling some 1,000 individuals. The butterflies are brought from around the world as chrysalises and released into the exhibit after emerging as adults. There are live butterfly releases every weekday at 2 p.m. and on weekends at 2 and 3 p.m.

Florida Fossils: Evolution of Life & Land 
Located in Powell Hall, the $2.5 million,  exhibit describes the history of the Florida Platform through five geologic time periods. The exhibition takes visitors on a walk through time beginning in the Eocene epoch, when Florida was underwater. Visitors travel through the Eocene, Oligocene, Miocene, Pliocene and Pleistocene epochs and see Florida's first land animals, evolving grasslands and savannahs and the land bridge between North and South America that formed about 3 million years ago. The exhibit ends with the arrival of the first humans in Florida near the end of the Pleistocene.

Over 90 percent of the exhibit's 500 fossils are real, and many were found within  of Gainesville.

The entrance to the hall showcases six fossil shark jaws, ranging in height from 2–9 feet. The exhibition begins with five extinction events described in dioramas that lead visitors onto the Florida Platform at about 66 million years ago, also known as the Dawn of the Age of Mammals. Displays include a primitive-toothed whale in the Eocene, a pig-like, extinct mammal from the Oligocene, a Miocene rhinoceros being attacked by two saber-toothed, cat-like animals, a -tall sloth standing on its hind legs in the Pliocene area and a 500,000-year-old jaguar chasing a peccary from the Pleistocene epoch. The time periods also include artwork by paleoartists from around the world, including a -tall steel sculpture of an extinct Terror Bird, Titanis walleri.

South Florida People & Environments 
The sequence of galleries is designed to give visitors a variety of experiences, including 3-D immersion environments and more focused learning centers.

Visitors enter the exhibit through a re-created scene of a Calusa fishing village as it may have looked about 500 years ago. A young Calusa boy carries home a shark on his shoulder, and behind him lies the village and view toward the Gulf of Mexico. Just past the village are four large glass wall panels depicting southwest Florida Indian art and environments. These images suggest the richness and complexity of both the cultural and natural history of the region. Beyond the panels is an orientation area, large enough for docents and teachers to gather a small group and introduce the exhibit. Interpretive panels preview the content and themes of the hall, augmented by a collage mural of south Florida people and environments.

Mangrove Boardwalk Gallery 
Visitors walk onto a wooden boardwalk into a full-scale re-creation of a southwest Florida mangrove forest and sea grass estuary. The boardwalk passes through mangrove trees, mudflats, and simulated water. Insect, bird, and water sounds combine with slow changes in lighting to capture the feeling of the environment. A huge 360-degree mural painting extends the view to distant barrier islands, bird rookeries, an upland area, and the heart of mangrove forests. Interpretive panels introduce the critical stories of the rich estuarine environment.

Natural Habitats Center 
This gallery features exhibits about the environments of South Florida.

Underwater Walk-through 

This gallery features a 12-times life-size underwater scene to explore the tiny organisms that sustain the estuary. Large sculptures of plants, fish, and invertebrates surround the walkway, and shimmering underwater light adds a sense of reality to the scene.

Fishing Heritage Gallery 
The Fishing Heritage Gallery tells the story of 6,000 years of fishing. This artifact-rich gallery highlights 6,000 years of fishing along Florida's Gulf coast. Displays focus on the fishing industry of the Calusa, their predecessors, and traditions that carried into the 20th century. We explore the significance of maritime adaptation as a basis for social and political complexity. Included are topics such as fish, nets, native and post-contact fishing techniques, watercraft, and waterworks. Visitors will learn about the remarkable engineering endeavors of the Calusa, who constructed large canals across southwest Florida; and the long-lived net-fishing tradition. Interactive multimedia stations illustrate topics such as net making and cordage manufacture, and a miniature diorama of a fishing village captures the essence of Calusa fishing. Artifacts include 1,000-year-old palm-fiber fishing nets, Calusa net-making tools, a wide range of shell tools, and an ancient wooden canoe paddle.

Calusa Mound and Village 
The dominant feature of this gallery is a large picture window and view of an outdoor mound. Sculptures of a Calusa family stand on the mound next to a palm-thatched house, suggesting that the visitor is looking outside and into the past. Inside, interpretive panels discuss mounds and Calusa town plans. Next to the window, an interactive model shows a cutaway view of a mound and explains archaeologists' methods of interpreting the past.

Calusa Leader's House 
This gallery showcases the society of the Calusa through a dramatic re-created scene. Visitors enter a palm-thatched building and find themselves in a Calusa leader's house during a political ceremony. Subdued lights and sounds of singing add drama to a scene of six human sculptures, based on known individuals from historic Spanish documents. The setting is the Calusa capital town of Calos, about the year 1564. A distant chief is visiting the Calusa leader and his close associates. Interpretive panels explain topics such as Calusa politics, social organization, and spiritual beliefs. Artifacts from the museum's collections complement the stories and include shell, bone, and metal ornaments as well as objects traded to the Calusa from places as far away as Missouri.

South Florida's Native American Legacy Gallery 
The Legacy Gallery presents some of the most rare and interesting objects in the South Florida collections. These include a 1,000-year-old hand-carved wooden panel with a painting of the near-extinct ivory-billed woodpecker, a wooden panel with a painted alligator, wooden figurines of animals and humans, ornaments made from precious metals, and numerous other carved wooden and bone objects. Interpretive panels discuss South Florida sites of special significance, including the remarkable "wet sites" that can yield detailed information when excavated with care and when recovered objects are appropriately treated. A multimedia interactive further explains the process of properly preserving and caring for wet-site materials.

Today's South Florida Indian People 
This gallery is devoted to the Indian people who live in South Florida today: the Seminole and Miccosukee. Interpretive panels address their history and their living traditions. Display cases feature many of the interesting objects from the museum's collections, including patchwork clothing, woodwork, basketry, silverwork, and artifacts from early Seminole sites.

Northwest Florida: Waterways & Wildlife 
This area is designed so that visitors move through different habitats as if they were traveling westward in the Florida panhandle.

First there is hammock forest with a highly detailed, -high wrap-around mural featuring 50 different plants and animals located from high in the trees to under logs on the forest floor.

The cave is a continuing exhibit from Dickinson Hall, and shows the inside of a northwest Florida cave, modeled after one found in Marianna Caverns State Park. There is information about minerals, hydrology, cave life and the fossils found in the cave's limestone layers.

The pitcher plant bog exhibit was modeled after bog communities around Eglin Air Force Base. Seepage bogs are characterized by saturated, highly acidic, sandy soil and are dominated by low growing plant species, such as grasses and carnivorous plants. A related exhibit with a change in scale shows larger-than-life pitcher plants.

The river scene represents 700 years ago on the banks of the Apalachicola River, with a 360-degree wraparound forest mural. There is also a Native American trading scene from  1300 AD showing an exchange between peoples of the Fort Walton culture and the Etowah. Northwest Florida rivers are filled with fossilized remains of now-extinct vertebrate animal species, and examples of these are featured in this exhibit along with many archaeological and ethnographic artifacts from the museum's collections.

The tidal march exhibit explains why the tidal marsh is an important ecosystem and what the specialized adaptations are that needed to survive there, as the changing tides constantly alter water and salinity levels.

A coastal diorama depicts dune habitats from the barrier islands from Panama City to Pensacola, and shows an osprey in flight, bird nests from the museum's collections, a cross-section of a sea turtle nest and coastal water sounds.

The final exhibit in this section is a floor-to-ceiling curved lagoon case, depicting how different sessile intertidal species stratify their habitats in the tidal zone. Jars with preserved specimens from the Ichthyology collection demonstrate the diversity of bony fishes from this habitat.

Florida Wildflower and Butterfly Garden 
This garden is located next to the west side of the McGuire Center. The Florida Wildflower Council appropriated funds from the Florida wildflower license tag revenue in order to fund this garden, the accompanying brochure, and a wildflower and butterfly display in the Florida Museum of Natural History. The display shows the life cycles of four butterflies, and depicts how the plants they use change in appearance over the four seasons.

Changing Gallery 
 The Changing Gallery is a  hall, also located in Powell Hall, which has hosted the Megalodon Exhibit, Hatching the Past, Chocolate, Tibet Exhibit and Sue the Tyrannosaurus rex and Inside Africa, both from the Field Museum in Chicago, Il.

 exhibits include Permian Monsters: Life Before the Dinosaurs and Whale People: Protectors of the Sea.

Research collections 
With the exception of the Lepidoptera collection, located in the McGuire Center, almost all other research collections are located in Dickinson Hall.

Lepidoptera 
This collection, unlike the rest of the museum's collections, is housed at the McGuire Center.  This department is relatively new when compared to the other collections and departments although their research is quite extensive.

Mammalogy 
Since 1992, the mammalogy collection at Dickinson Hall has undergone rapid growth and expansion. Between 1979 and 2007, the collection has doubled, increasing from 14,000 to over 30,000 specimens. Since 2002, the Florida Museum has acquired the University of Miami's cetacean collection and the U.S. Fish and Wildlife Service's manatee collection.
 
The mammalogy collection has roughly 30,618 cataloged specimens and approximately 1,000 non-cataloged specimens. It consists primarily of skins and skulls, although entire skeletons have been prepared from all specimens acquired since 1992. There are 205 large tanned skins and 4,500, roughly 16% of the collection, has been preserved in fluid.  The collection is preponderated by small mammals, primarily rodents and bats, from the southeastern US, the Caribbean, Latin America, South-America and  2,600 specimens from Pakistan.
 
An important component of the mammalogy collection is the marine mammal collection, consisting of 310 manatee, dolphin and over five hundred whales.   The large size of the collection is  the result of a long-term cooperative effort with the U.S. National Biological Service's Sirenia research project, Marine Mammal  Stranding Network, researchers David and Melba Caldwell, and Marineland of Florida. Other major collections that have been acquired and/or cataloged over the past 15 years include:

 Cross Florida Barge Canal collection (Florida Game & Fresh Water Fish Commission - 1,800 small mammals)
 Bowen collection of beach mice, Peromyscus polionotus (Bowen 1968) - 3,400
 James Layne collection of small mammals from Archbold Biological Station (2,100).
 Involvement with the Florida Panther Recovery Program has resulted in the only significant collection of this endangered subspecies in the entire United States with fewer than 50 individuals.
 
Average growth rate of the collection between 1989 and 1994 is 640 specimens per year, and 800 specimens per year for the previous 5 years; this is double the growth recorded for 1972-1979 of 290 specimens per year as reported in the survey of North American collections of recent mammals. Orphaned or donated collections account for approximately 60% of reported growth. 
 
The mammal collection is primarily a research collection, but experiences a broad range of uses beyond this primary function. It is used as a teaching collection for undergraduate and graduate students; reference collection for law enforcement as a forensic identification of endangered species; as a reference collection for carnivore feeding studies i.e. owl pellet and scat analysis;  a comparative material for students and faculty of zoo archeology and vertebrate paleontology (post-cranial skeletal collection).  As part of a large university, the uses of the collection are diverse including applications in biomedical studies, wildlife dentistry, and even studies of environmental contaminants. As the concern for Florida's environment increases, so does the monitoring of habitats and species by state and federal biologists, resulting in an increased interest in the historical and recent distributions of mammals in Florida by a variety of state and federal agencies.

Ichthyology 
The Florida Museum of Natural History ichthyological collection was ranked as the tenth most important fish specimen resource in the North America and the second highest by the ranking National Center by the American Society of Ichthyologists and Herpetologists. Since that survey was completed, the 65,000 lot University of Miami collection was transferred and is currently being integrated into complete collection.

The collection itself contains more than 197,000 cataloged lots of which there are 2.15 million specimens, representing more than 7,000 species. In addition, there is an unsorted backlog of about 25,000 lots, about 250,000 specimens. Most of the uncatalogued and backlog material was acquired through transfer of the important collections previously housed at the National Marine Fisheries Service biological laboratories in Miami, Pascagoula, MS, and the University of Miami. The collection currently contains primary and secondary types of more than 325 taxa of freshwater and marine fishes.

The osteological collection comprises 2,500 lots of disarticulated skeletons representing over 320 species. Skeletal holdings emphasize the southeastern United States, Caribbean, Central American and northwestern South American ichthyofaunas. Representative specimens of over 200 species have been cleared and stained. A radiograph collection and the original field notes of numerous individuals and organizations, including station sheets for virtually all U.S. Fish and Wildlife Service/National Marine Fisheries Service and University of Miami research vessels, are maintained.

The principal strengths of the fish collection are, in approximate order of importance, its holdings of (1) western and eastern Atlantic shelf and deep water marine fishes, (2) western Atlantic reef fishes, (3) North American freshwater fishes, especially from the southeastern United States, and (4) freshwater fishes from certain parts of Central America, South America and the West Indies. Of the above, categories (1), and (2) are nearly equal in importance.

Most of the material acquired from the National Marine Fisheries Service Tropical Atlantic Biological (TABL) collection consists of western Atlantic fishes from nearshore shallows to moderate depths, with the families Argentinidae, Atherinidae, Balistidae, Batrachoididae, Belonidae, Bothidae, Branchiostomatidae, Caproidae, Carangidae, Clupeidae, Congridae, Cynoglossidae, Dasyatidae, Engraulididae, Exocoetidae, Fundulidae, Gadidae, Gerreidae, Haemulidae, Hemiramphidae, Lutjanidae, Macrouridae, Monacanthidae, Mugilidae, Ogcocephalidae, Ophichthidae, Ophidiidae, Paralichthyidae, Peristediidae, Priacanthidae, Rajidae, Sciaenidae, Scombridae, Serranidae, Scorpaenidae, Scyliorhinidae, Soleidae, Sparidae, Sphyraenidae, Stromateidae, Squalidae, Syngnathidae, Synodontidae, Tetraodontidae, and Triglidae most common. These collections have been substantially augmented by the field activities of museum personnel and donations made over the last 20 years. Eastern Atlantic collections from the Gulf of Guinea are available in some abundance. The western Atlantic collections acquired from the National Marine Fisheries Service Pascagoula laboratory and University of Miami are generally from greater depths and represent some of the museum's most valuable resources. Deepwater anguilliform, salmoniform, stomiiform, aulopiform, myctophiform, and ophidiiform families are particularly well represented. For certain families, i.e. Searsiidae, Alepocephalidae, these collections may be among the best North American holdings from the western Atlantic region.

The holdings of western Atlantic reef fishes are among the most important in existence, with the following geographic areas most heavily collected: Florida, the Bahamas, Isla de Providencia, the Cayman Islands, the Virgin Islands and the Lesser Antilles. Smaller numbers of reef fish collections exist from Puerto Rico, Jamaica, Sombrero Island, other Lesser Antilles islands, continental islands off northern South America, Brazil, and Ascension Island. There are a substantial number of reef fishes from off the Carolinas. Major reef groups represented include the Acanthuridae, Antennariidae, Apogonidae, Blenniidae, Chaenopsidae, Chaetodontidae, Clinidae, Dactyloscopidae, Gobiesocidae, Gobiidae, Grammistidae, Haemulidae, Holocentridae, Kyphosidae, Labridae, Lutjanidae, Mullidae, Muraenidae, Ostraciidae, Opistognathidae, Pomacanthidae, Pomacentridae, Scaridae, Serranidae, and Tripterygiidae. Eastern Pacific reef collections are present from the Pearl Islands south to Ecuador. Also available are a fair number of Indo-Pacific reef fishes acquired by staff collecting and by donations received from the Bishop Museum and the National Museum of Natural History. Over 200 shore and estuarine collections have been made from the Caribbean coasts of Costa Rica and Panama.

The museum's worldwide holdings of elasmobranchs, particularly squaloid sharks, have grown rapidly in the last 15 years and are an important international resource. Other elasmobranch groups prominently represented include Carcharhinidae, Dasyatidae, Gymnuridae, Myliobatidae, Rajidae, Rhinobatidae, Scyliorhinidae, Sphyrnidae, Squatinidae, Torpedinidae and Triakidae.

Holdings of freshwater fishes are greatest from the southeastern United States, particularly Florida. In addition, an effort has been made to obtain as complete a taxonomic and geographic coverage of freshwater species as possible from throughout North America. As a result, over 90 percent of the freshwater fish species from the United States and Canada are represented in the collection. Best represented are members of the Catostomidae, Centrarchidae, Cyprinidae, Elassomatidae, Fundulidae, Ictaluridae, Lepisosteidae, Percidae, Petromyzontidae and Poeciliidae. Freshwater fishes from Bolivia, Venezuela, Colombia, Hispaniola, Guatemala, Panama and Costa Rica are currently represented in moderate to large numbers in the collection. The Florida Museum of Natural History's Hispaniolan holdings are unsurpassed and the Venezuelan holdings are growing continuously. A wide spectrum of characoid, gymnotoid and siluroid families, cichlids, and poeciliids are especially well represented

Malacology 
 The mollusk collection was initiated through the efforts of T. van Hyning, the first director of the museum, and was small and composed mostly of local taxa until 1965.  In 1973, the mollusk collection consisted of 22,174 cataloged lots and ranked 19th in the US. The collection has grown rapidly since, through numerous field surveys and acquisition of relinquished collections. Since 2000, Malacology has also hosted a growing collection of non-molluscan marine invertebrates. About 100,000 species of mollusks are known, and the collection holds over 30,000 species among 400,000 lots of specimens. Over 300,000 lots are now databased and accessible online. The collection is among the five largest in the US, and one of the most rapidly growing. It is second largest mollusk collection in the world in online accessibility.

The collection is especially strong in regional taxa. Malacology has one of the largest collections of terrestrial and freshwater mollusks from the southeastern US. Overall marine mollusks comprise 38% of cataloged holdings; freshwater species make up 18% and terrestrial taxa 44%. Gastropods comprise 83%, bivalves 16%, while all other mollusk classes combined <1% of the collection. Three quarters of the collection is from the Western Hemisphere, while 18% is from tropical Australasia and surrounding Pacific and Indian Ocean islands. The mollusk collection has unique strengths in land, freshwater and marine mollusks. The museum has the largest land snail collection in the world from Hispaniola, Mexico-Central America, Pakistan and Thailand, and also has especially large holdings from the southeastern United States, West Indies, Andean South America, Madagascar, Southeast Asia, and Oceania. Freshwater mollusk collections are strong for the southeastern United States, Mexico, Central America, Andean South America, and the Philippines. Large subtropical and tropical West Atlantic and Indo-West Pacific holdings characterize the marine collection, and tropical marine collections are undergoing rapid growth. These strengths reflect a former regional focus of the museum and research focus of the curators: on terrestrial and freshwater mollusks of Middle America and Southeast Asia, and on tropical marine mollusks, respectively.

Botany and the Florida Herbarium 
 The botany collection is an excellent representation of the vascular flora of Florida and the southeastern United States coastal plain, including abundant material from the 19th century. The bryophyte and lichen collections encompass Florida and tropical areas, especially Costa Rica, Venezuela and Brazil. The Fungal Herbarium is exhibits Florida fungi, especially agarics and polypores, and the wood collection is worldwide with a tropical emphasis. The addition of a preeminent brings the total museum botanical collection holdings to around one-half of a million specimens.

Noteworthy additions include the A. A. Cuthbert Herbarium of approximately 5000 specimens, the plant holdings of the Florida State Museum (4711 specimens, including the Herbarium of S. C. Hood), several thousand more S. C. Hood collections, 15770 specimens of lichens, liverworts and mosses collected by Severin Rapp, wood blocks and vouchers of American wood and economic trees from the New York State School of Forestry, George E. Ritchey specimens from the U. S. Plant Introduction Garden, Edward and Robert P. St. John Florida ferns, innumerable West and Arnold collections and those received through inter-institutional exchange. The herbarium also benefited from the prominent studies of H. Harold Hume (Zephyranthes, Ilex, and Camellia) and William A. Murrill (Crataegus and fungi) and in 1989 Angus K. Gholson, Jr. donated his entire herbarium (15,000 specimens), library and related equipment and supplies. This is an excellent collection especially rich in its representation of the flora of the Florida Panhandle.

Herpetology 
 With approximately 202,000 specimens, the herpetology collection is estimated to be the 9th largest in the US. Its skeletal collection, with more than 11,000 disarticulated skeletons and a small number of cleared and stained specimens, is 5th largest. An average of 3,800 specimens a year are catalogued. The collection contains 60 holotypes and 919 paratypes representing 176 taxa. Additional taxa are in the process of being described.

Though worldwide in scope, the collection contains approximately 2,300 species from the Neotropics, 600 from Asia, 390 from the Nearctic, 350 from Africa, 275 from the Palearctic, and 220 from Australia/Oceania. Large holdings of land tortoises and varanid lizards resulted from Walter Auffenberg's research, and his work on the Herpetology of Pakistan produced the world's largest Pakistan collection. Large numbers of sea turtles came from Archie Carr and his students. Wayne King's surveys of Bolivia, Paraguay, Brazil, Honduras, Nicaragua, and Guyana, assembled the largest collection of Latin American crocodilians. Sizable collections of Kinosternid turtles were donated by John Iverson, softshells by Peter Meylan, and Panama amphibians and reptiles by the late Howard W. Campbell. Samuel R. Telford, Jr., provided extensive collections from Japan, Burma, Panama, Venezuela, Tanzania, and Pakistan, and smaller numbers from Zaire, Thailand and the Philippines. Recorded vocalizations of 46 species of amphibians and 20 species of reptiles are catalogued in the museum's Bioacoustic Archives.

Ornithology 
 The recent bird skeleton collection of 24,500 specimens, representing about 3,000 species, is approximately fifth largest in the world in number of specimens and species. In 1992, the museum received the recent bird skeleton collection assembled by Prof. Pierce Brodkorb of the University of Florida's Department of Zoology.  The skeleton collection has grown by 140% since 2002. It contains specimens from 47 U.S. states and 103 countries.

The largest collections by state:

The top ten countries are:

Taxonomically the collection ranges across the class Aves, representing 23 orders, 128 families, and 950 genera.

The bird skin collection contains approximately 20,500 specimens representing at least 2,300 species. These are mostly study skins, but in recent years the division has prepared a large proportion of new specimens as flat skins or spread wings with associated skeletons. In 1992, the division also received a collection of approximately 3,000 skins. The skin collection has grown by 23% in the last five years. Also wide-ranging taxonomically, it represents 27 orders, 129 families, and 850 genera. Rarities include skins of ivory-billed woodpeckers and extinct dusky seaside sparrows, passenger pigeons, and Carolina parakeets.

The egg collection, consisting of 10,400 sets representing 733 species, is 11th largest in North America in number of sets and 15th largest in number of species. It represents approximately 90% of the species and subspecies of North American birds. The egg collection has grown by 1% in the last five years. It is cataloged in a card file that includes original collectors' data slips or page references to the collector's field notes. Especially well represented are sets from New England and Florida. The collection is rich in sets of raptor eggs, including bald eagles, ospreys, broad-winged hawks, red-shouldered hawks, crested caracaras, American kestrels, the Florida races of seaside sparrows and clapper rails. Rarities include sets of passenger pigeon, Carolina parakeet, and Bachman's warbler eggs.

The bird sound collection, in the museum Bioacoustic Archives, with 20,500 cataloged recordings representing about 3,000 species, is the fourth largest in the world in number of species. In the Western Hemisphere it is the second largest in number of species and third largest in number of recordings. The sound collection is completely cataloged in an electronic database, and the sound recordings themselves were digitized over a five-year period beginning in 2009 with help from $446,000 National Science Foundation grant. The sound recordings are available online.

Geographical strengths include North America, especially Florida, and the Neotropics, with smaller but notable numbers of recordings from Africa, Australia, and Southeast Asia. Some taxonomic groups especially well represented are tinamous, trogons, woodpeckers, antbirds, New World flycatchers, wrens, New World wood warblers, and corvids.

Vertebrate Paleontology 
The FLMNH vertebrate fossil collections feature rich samples of all vertebrate classes, mainly from the Cenozoic Era. Included are about 400,000 specimens. Holotypes number about 200 specimens. The FLMNH vertebrate fossil collections also include the former Florida Geological Survey Collection and the UF Department of Zoology Fossil Bird Collection. Each of these collections is maintained in a separate catalog, under the acronyms UF/FGS and UF/PB, respectively. The FLMNH collections provide the most complete basis available for study of Cenozoic vertebrate paleontology in the southeastern United States and the Caribbean Basin.

History of the Vertebrate Paleontology Collections

University of Florida (UF) Collection 
The UF collection currently contains about 385,000 specimens assigned to over 234,000 unique catalogue numbers and over 150 holotypes. The UF collection has experienced rapid, sometimes explosive, growth since the 1950s and now ranks in the top five nationally in terms of total catalogued specimens. Consistent with our museum's mission as the official repository for Florida's natural history specimens, about 90 percent of this collection comes from about 1,000 separate localities throughout Florida. A particular strength of the UF collection is the extraordinary array of land-animals from the past 25 million years in Florida, forming the best record documenting the evolution of ancient vertebrate life in eastern North America over this interval. Other major strengths of the UF collection include extensive holdings from Haiti, the Dominican Republic, the Cayman Islands, Jamaica, and other Caribbean islands, fossils from Central and South America (especially Bolivia, Honduras, and Panama), and specimens from the late Eocene to Oligocene "Badlands" of western Nebraska. On-going field work begun by our new curator Jonathan Bloch in 2004 will over time produce a significant collection of Paleocene and early Eocene vertebrates from basins in Wyoming and Montana.

Prior to 1953, the UF collection consisted of only a few hundred specimens, mostly acquired through public donation, and of little scientific value. Beginning in 1953, serious fossil prospecting began at the University of Florida, initially led by Robert S. Bader and Walter A. Auffenberg, both then members of the Department of Biology. Clayton Ray became the museum's first curator of vertebrate paleontology in 1959. He left in 1963 to take a position at the Smithsonian. Recognizing the importance of vertebrate paleontology in Florida, in 1964 museum director J. C. Dickinson hired two vertebrate paleontology curators, S. David Webb and Thomas H. Patton. Together they quickly moved the museum's research program to the forefront of the field, symbolized by their hosting in Gainesville the prestigious annual meeting of the Society of Vertebrate Paleontology in the fall of 1964, the first time this meeting had been held in the Southeastern United States. Patton left in the mid-1970s to pursue a career in the legal profession, and was replaced in 1977 by Bruce J. MacFadden. Webb retired in 2003, and Jonathan I. Bloch was hired to fill the vacant curator position. Since 1964 the FLMNH VP curators have mentored many dozens of graduate students, produced numerous books, monographs, and research papers, and directed field operations in Florida, the Caribbean, Central and South America, and the western U.S. Another important feat was the creation of the Florida Paleontological Society and the forming of a strong bond between the professional paleontologists at the museum and the amateur fossil collectors throughout the state of Florida. Although technically curators in other museum divisions, Walter Auffenberg (Herpetology) and Charles A. Woods (Mammalogy) both had research interests that included paleontology and helped build the collection.

In addition to the curators, other full-time staff at the FLMNH have made significant contributions to the UF collections. The first fossil preparator was Howard H. Converse, who worked at the museum from the late 1960s through the mid-1980s. He was followed by Russell McCarty, who retired in 2006. Jason Bourque is the current vertebrate paleontology preparator and studies fossil and living turtles. Gary S. Morgan was collections manager from 1981 through 1993, and oversaw the curation of massive numbers of specimens from the Love Bone Bed, Thomas Farm, Leisey Shell Pit, Bone Valley, Haiti, and elsewhere. He was replaced by Marc Frank (1994–1998) and Richard C. Hulbert (2000–present).

Florida Geological Survey Collection 
The Florida Geological Survey fossil vertebrate collection (FGS) was started during the 1910s and was originally housed in Tallahassee. Under the direction of E. H. Sellards, Herman Gunter, and S. J. Olsen, the FGS collection was the primary source of fossil vertebrate descriptions from Florida until the early 1960s. World-renowned paleontologists such as George G. Simpson, Edwin H. Colbert, and Henry F. Osborn wrote scientific papers about specimens in the FGS collection in addition to Sellards and Olsen. In 1976 the entire FGS fossil vertebrate collection was transferred to the Florida Museum of Natural History with support from a National Science Foundation grant. The UF/FGS collection is composed of about 22,000 specimens assigned to about 10,000 catalogue numbers, and almost all of them were collected in Florida. The majority of specimens in the UF/FGS collection are mammals, followed by reptiles, birds, and a relatively small number of amphibians and fish. Although there are some sites that are unique to the UF/FGS collection, many of the sites overlap with holdings in the main UF and UF/PB collections. The major strengths of the UF/FGS collection are historically important samples from the early Miocene Thomas Farm locality, the middle Miocene and early Pliocene deposits of the Bone Valley Region, Polk County, and from the late Pleistocene Vero locality, Indian River County.

Pierce Brodkorb Collection 
The Pierce Brodkorb Collection (UF/PB) was amassed by Professor Brodkorb of the University of Florida over his career as one of the world's foremost experts on fossil birds. His heirs donated his extensive collections of modern bird skeletons and fossil birds to the Florida Museum of Natural History in 1992. The modern skeletons are housed by the museum's Ornithology collection. Brodkorb's fossil bird collection was curated and computer cataloged with support from the National Science Foundation. The UF/PB collection is composed of about 8,500 cataloged specimens and includes 42 holotypes. About 85 per cent of the UF/PB specimens were collected in Florida, and range in age from early Miocene to latest Pleistocene. Other large holdings are Pleistocene birds from Bermuda and the Bahamas.

Archaeology

Environmental Archaeology 
The Environmental Archaeology Program (EAP) of the Florida Museum was established by Dr. Elizabeth Wing in the early 1960s (as the Zooarchaeology collection) and was curated by her until her retirement in 2001. The EAP collections include archaeological animal, plant, and soil materials that represent 14,000 years of human-environmental relationships in the early circum-Caribbean Americas (including the SE USA, Central America, the Caribbean, and northern South America). The collections are strongest in zoological specimens (modern comparative and zooarchaeological), but since the 1990s have grown to include significant holdings of both archaeobotanical/botanical and archaeopedological materials. Environmental archaeology, a subdiscipline of anthropology, reconstructs the long relationship between people and environments using biotic (animal and plant) and abiotic (geological) remains from archaeological sites. The EAP researchers focus on integrated analyses that explore every aspect of that relationship, from the environmental conditions during human occupation, to human use of and impact on natural resources, to human perceptions and symbolic interpretations of aspects of the plants, animals, and landscapes of their environments.

Caribbean Archaeology 

The Caribbean Archeology Program Collection was founded in 1960 by Dr. Ripley P. Bullen. The program is based around one of the largest systematic collections of pre-Columbian artifacts in North America. What the collection lacks in size is compensated for by its diversity. The collection contains systematic collections from sites on the islands of Antigua, Aruba, Bahamas, Barbados, Curaçao, Dominican Republic, Grenada, Guadeloupe, Guyana, Haiti, Jamaica, Marie-Galante, Martinique, Puerto Rico, St. Lucia, St. Martin, St. Vincent and the Grenadines, Suriname, Tobago, Trinidad, Turks and Caicos, U.S. Virgin Islands, and Venezuela, each collection has accompanying documentation.

The "Bullen" collection was recently re-inventoried and reorganized. During this reorganization, type collections; composed of all the artifacts illustrated in Bullen's publications, were also created. These collection catalogs, which are based on the tables published in the Bullens' reports, are available for all of the islands and sites represented in the collection. Presently a map of the West Indies and a list of the islands and the sites represented in the collection are available to the public.

The collection includes artifacts recovered during excavations directed by Dr. Charles A. Hoffman, Jr. on the islands of Antigua and St. Kitts, a study collection derived from the excavations directed by Dr. Kathleen A. Deagan from the sites of En Bas Saline and Puerto Réal, Haiti, a collection of important artifacts donated  by Mr. Leon Wilder that were surface collected from sites in Grenada and a number of artifacts recovered from sites in Jamaica and Grenada that were recently donated by Mr. Geoffrey Senior.

Survey and excavation projects are an integral part of the Caribbean Archeology Program. Since 1987, research teams from the museum have undertaken surveys and excavations in Antigua, the Bahamas, Grand Cayman, Grenada, Haiti, Jamaica, and the Turks and Caicos Islands.

Ceramic Technology Laboratory 
The Ceramic Technology Laboratory was established in 1977 under the direction of Dr. Prudence Rice, then UF professor of anthropology. Pottery analysis plays an integral role in archaeological research at the museum as it constitutes the predominant material remaining at most archaeological sites investigated by museum curators. In addition pottery constitutes a very significant proportion of the Anthropology collections. The Ceramic Technology Laboratory is equipped for basic paste characterization studies: binocular microscope for gross identification of temper or paste constituents; a petrographic microscope for precise mineral identification in thin section; an electric furnace used for refiring experiments and for comparative investigation of clay samples collected from the vicinity of archaeological sites. Analysis of physical and mineralogical properties of the pottery are undertaken to provide precise data to address research questions regarding chronology, provenience or manufacturing origins, processes of production, culture change, and the development of social and economic complexity in prehistoric Florida, the Southeastern US, and the Caribbean Basin. The department is committed to the continuance of this research program as the capacity for in-house specialized analysis of pottery enhances the competitiveness for research grants.

The Ceramic Technology Laboratory houses an extensive pottery type collection of prehistoric and historic period aboriginal pottery from Florida and the Southeastern U.S. The Florida materials represent type specimens assembled by Ripley Bullen, John Goggin, and Gordon Willey, pioneers of Florida archeology. The type collections serve as a primary comparative resource for museum scientists, graduate students, and visiting researchers. The Ceramic Technology Laboratory also curates fragments of pottery samples used in paste characterization studies.

Florida Archaeology 

The Florida Archeology Collection includes artifacts spanning 12,000 years of human history in the Southeast. While the focus of this collection is on Florida, some materials from Georgia and other localities are included. These items are curated as a tangible record of the people who have made Florida their home. The Florida Archeology Collections come from Central and North Florida and the Panhandle regions. All counties including and north of Sarasota, De Soto, Hardee, Polk, Osceola, and Indian River counties are included in this collection. Exceptions to this rule are sites situated within Colonial St. Augustine and historical sites with no pre-Columbian material present, collections from these locales are included in the Historical Archaeology Collections. Counties to the south are part of the South Florida Archeology Collections. Information concerning policies associated with our collections are found below.

The Excavated Collections include all archaeological materials that have been excavated using systematic recovery techniques. While recovery techniques vary depending on the project, site, and supervising archaeologist, all of these collections have associated provenience data. Documentation such as field notes, maps, and photographs are often available with the collection.
Below is a select list of sites in the Florida Archeology Collections.

Abraham's Old Town 
Abraham's Old Town or Pilaklikaha is a multicomponent site in Sumter County. The site includes a ceramic period occupation (Pasco and Sand-Tempered Plain) and possibly a preceramic component. The site's significance is its identification as Pilaklikaha, a town inhabited by Black Seminoles during the early 19th century. The collection includes lithics, ceramics (both European and Seminole), glass beads, trade pipe fragments, bottle glass, brick, cut nails and other metal fragments recovered during excavations from 1998 to 2001.

Aucilla River Prehistory Project 
The collection contains prehistoric lithic, bone and mammoth ivory tools, ceramics, historic materials, plant remains, and Pleistocene and Holocene fossils from assorted sites along the Aucilla River. Notable items in this collection include the fossilized bones of Pleistocene animals exhibiting butcher and cut marks, numerous stone Paleoindian projectile points, and carved ivory shafts.

Bolen Bluff 
Bolen Bluff is a multicomponent site located south of Paynes Prairie. The site was excavated by Ripley Bullen in 1949. Large portions of the site were destroyed and used for fill during highway construction. The collections include numerous stone points and tools including: Suwannee, Bolen, Arredondo, and Pinellas points, as well as: stone adzes, hoes, drills, and scrapers. Pottery types span the entire range of ceramic periods in the area: Orange, Transitional, Deptford, Weeden Island, St. Johns, and Alachua.

de Soto Survey 
The de Soto archaeological survey project was conducted from 1986–1991 to locate and identify early Spanish-Indian contact period sites in north Florida. The six surveys identified or revisited over 750 archaeological sites in 15 counties (Alachua, Baker, Bradford, Citrus, Clay, Columbia, Gilchrist, Lafayette, Madison, Marion, Putnam, Sumter, Suwannee, and Union). Some of the major sites identified and excavated were: the location of the Spanish mission at Fig Springs, the Spanish mission of Santa Fe and the Indian Pond site.

McKeithen Site 
The McKeithen Site is a Weeden Island (AD 200–900) site in Columbia County excavated during the late 1970s. The site is composed of a village area and three mounds. The collections from the site include an excellent variety of Weeden Island ceramics, including numerous whole or almost whole vessels from different areas of the site. The collections also include a variety of stone points and tools, grinding stones, mica, and some faunal and floral remains.

Richardson Site 
The Richardson Site is a Potano Indian village near Orange Lake that dates from the late pre-Columbian and early Spanish mission period. The site provides us with valuable information on Potano houses and early Spanish missionization. Collections include a large collection of Alachua pottery, lithics, glass beads, wrought nails, and faunal material. It may be the site of the town of Potano visited by the Hernando de Soto expedition, and of the early 17th century mission of San Buenaventura de Potano.

Spanish Mission collections 
The collections from Spanish mission sites are an important part of the Florida archaeological collections. The Florida Archeology curates large collections from 11 mission sites: Baptizing Spring, Fox Pond, Santa Fe, Fig Springs, Indian Pond, Scott Miller, San Juan, Beatty, Blue Bead and Baldree and the sites on Amelia Island. There are also numerous other Spanish mission period sites associated with missions or haciendas, including: Moon Lake, Richardson, Zetrouer, Carlisle, and Peacock Lake.

Tatham Mound 
Tatham Mound is a Safety Harbor culture mound located near the Withlacoochee River in Citrus County. The site was also in use at the time of the Soto entrada as evidenced by numerous Spanish artifacts dating to mid-16th century. The collections include Safety Harbor ceramic vessels, Pinellas points and other lithic tools, and many shell artifacts: gorget, celt, dippers, and beads. Spanish artifacts include: metal beads and pendants, Nueva Cadiz and other glass beads, and metal artifacts including chisels, spikes, and armor fragments.

Donated private collections 
Private collections donated by individuals and families represent an important aspect of the Florida Archeology collections. These collections include provenanced artifacts from all over Florida and a limited amount of material from other areas of North America. Many of these collections are from well-known sites and are valuable sources of exhibit quality artifacts and research collections. These collections range in size from small surface collections from single sites to collections that cover large portions of the state and include thousands of artifacts.
A representative sample of donated private collections curated at the museum includes the following collections organized by family name.

Bullen Projectile Point Typology Collection 
The Ripley Bullen Projectile Point Type Collection is the original assortment of artifacts archeologist Ripley P. Bullen used to create the first formal point typology for Florida in 1967. Bullen's typology was revised in 1975 and published as A Guide to the Identification of Florida Projectile Points. This collection is curated as an original reference collection for visiting researchers and the general public.

Osteological collections 
Human osteological collections curated at the Florida Museum of Natural History include skeletal remains from pre-Columbian and historic archaeological sites across Florida, Georgia, and several localities in the Caribbean. These collections are maintained for research and teaching purposes. Access to these collections is limited to the academic community and professionals in the private sector involved in scholarly research.

Historical archaeology 
The historical archaeology collections of the Florida Museum of Natural History consists of more than 2 million excavated specimens from more than 100 sites throughout Florida and Latin America. They include the largest known systematic collection of Spanish colonial archaeological specimens in the country, representing sites of domestic, military, religious and commercial sites dating from 1492 through the 19th century.

The collection also incorporates archaeological specimens from a variety of non-Spanish 18th- and 19th-century sites, including homesteads, plantations, trading posts, forts and towns.

In addition to systematic collections resulting form excavation, the Historical Archeology Department also maintains extensive collections of type specimens, comparative specimens and published specimens for historical archeology. The materials span the period of 1493–1900, and are used extensively as a reference collection, a comparative collection and a teaching collection.

The St. Augustine Collections 
The materials from St. Augustine, Florida (1565–present) were generated by systematic archaeological excavations from a forty-year period (1959–1999) on 33 Spanish colonial, British colonial, African American, American Indian and post-colonial sites in St. Augustine, Florida. They include more than 1 million items of glass, metals, stone, shell and bone. They are curated jointly by the University of Florida, the Florida Division of Historical Resources and the City of St. Augustine at the museum.

The Latin American Collections 
Some of the earliest historical archaeology collections in the region are found in our collection. John Goggin's ambitious program of historical archeology during the 1940s and 1950s generated a large collection of materials from sites throughout the Caribbean and Central America. His collaborations with such researchers as Emile Boyrie of the Dominican Republic, José Cruxent of Venezuela and Irving Rouse of Yale additionally resulted in the exchange of smaller comparative collections from throughout the region.

Excavations in Haiti conducted by Charles Fairbanks and Kathleen Deagan between 1979 and 1988 also generated two large Historic-era collections that are being curated at the Florida Museum of Natural History on behalf of the Haitian government.

The Historical Florida Collections 
In addition to the collections from St. Augustine and Latin America, the Historical Archeology collections also include materials excavated from a variety of towns, missions, plantations and forts in Florida and the southeastern United States.

Footnotes

External links

 Florida Museum of Natural History
 McGuire Center for Lepidoptera and Biodiversity
 Butterfly Rainforest
 Randell Research Center
 Curtis Phillips Center for the Performing Arts
 Samuel P. Harn Museum of Art

1891 establishments in Florida
Buildings at the University of Florida
Butterfly houses
Florida Native American Heritage Trail
Institutions accredited by the American Alliance of Museums
Museums established in 1891
Museums in Gainesville, Florida
Natural history museums in Florida
Paleontology in Florida
Science museums in Florida
Tourist attractions in Gainesville, Florida
University and college buildings completed in 1891
University museums in Florida